The Mississippi Department of Public Safety is a state agency of Mississippi, headquartered in Jackson. It has locations in all counties, and performs services including drivers licensure.

References

External links

 Mississippi Department of Public Safety

State agencies of Mississippi